Thomas W. Scott (born 1950) is an American entomologist. In December 2020, Scott was one of the 11 UC Davis researchers listed on the 2020 Highly Cited Researchers list by the Web of Science Group. At the time of the announcement, he had published 288 papers and recorded more than 33,500 citations.

Early life and education
Scott was born in 1950. He completed his Bachelor of Science degree from Bowling Green State University (BGSW) in 1973 before changing to biology for his Master's degree. He eventually left BGSW for his PhD from Pennsylvania State University and did a National Institutes of Health post-doctoral fellowship in epidemiology at the Yale School of Medicine.

Career
Upon completing his formal education, Scott became a faculty member in the Department of Entomology at the University of Maryland, College Park before relocating in 1996 to the Department of Entomology at the University of California, Davis. While at UC Davis, Scott co-founded the Center for Vector-Borne Research, which was composed of researchers throughout the UC System, and directed the UC Davis Arbovirus Research Unit. He also served as vice chair of the UC Davis Entomology Department. Throughout his tenure at UC Davis, Scott's research focused on mosquito ecology, evolution of mosquito-virus interactions, epidemiology of mosquito-borne disease, and evaluation of novel products and strategies for mosquito control and disease prevention. In 2010, he was elected a Fellow of the Entomological Society of America as a result of his research.

In his final year at UC Davis, Scott published the findings of his 12-year study of dengue infections in Iquitos, Peru to explain why interventions are frequently unsuccessful in efforts to prevent the mosquito-borne disease. As a result of his research, Scott was bestowed the honorary title of distinguished professor and elected a Fellow of the American Society for Tropical Medicine and Hygiene. Prior to retiring in June 2015, Scott was also named the recipient of the C. W. Woodworth Award, the highest award given by the Pacific Branch of the Entomological Society of America.

After retiring in 2015, Scott continued his dengue research in Peru and continued to serve as Chair of the WHO Vector Control Advisory Group and Co-Chair of the WHO Steering Committee for the Global Vector Control Response. In December 2020, Scott was one of the 11 UC Davis researchers listed on the 2020 Highly Cited Researchers list by the Web of Science Group. At the time of the announcement, he had published 288 papers and recorded more than 33,500 citations.

Awards and honors
He is a Fellow of the Entomological Society of America, American Association for the Advancement of Science, and American Society of Tropical Medicine and Hygiene; National Research Council Associate; Past-President of the Society for Vector Ecology; past-Chair of the Mosquito Modeling Group in the program on Research and Policy in Infectious Disease Dynamics; Chair of the WHO Vector Control Advisory Group; and Co-Chair of the WHO Steering Committee for the Global Vector Control Response.

References

External links

Living people
Fellows of the American Association for the Advancement of Science
Fellows of the Entomological Society of America
Fellows of the American Society of Tropical Medicine and Hygiene
Pennsylvania State University alumni
Bowling Green State University alumni
University of California, Davis faculty
University of Maryland, College Park faculty
American entomologists
1950 births